Calothyriopsis is a genus of fungi in the Microthyriaceae family.

Species
As accepted by Species Fungorum;
 Calothyriopsis conferta 
 Calothyriopsis mali 
 Calothyriopsis pouteriae 
 Calothyriopsis roupalae

References

External links
Index Fungorum

Microthyriales